Rubidium fluoride (RbF) is the fluoride salt of rubidium. It is a cubic crystal with rock-salt structure.

There are several methods for synthesising rubidium fluoride. One involves reacting rubidium hydroxide with hydrofluoric acid:
RbOH + HF → RbF + H2O
Another method is to neutralize rubidium carbonate with hydrofluoric acid:
Rb2CO3 + 2HF → 2RbF + H2O + CO2
Another possible method is to react rubidium hydroxide with ammonium fluoride:
RbOH + NH4F → RbF + H2O + NH3
The least used method due to expense of rubidium metal is to react it directly with fluorine gas, as rubidium reacts violently with halogens:
2Rb + F2 → 2RbF

References

 

Rubidium compounds
Fluorides
Alkali metal fluorides
Rock salt crystal structure